Department of Youth may refer to:

 "Department of Youth" (song), a song by Alice Cooper
 Department of Youth (New Brunswick), part of the Government of New Brunswick